Adriaanus Jacobus 'Adriaan' Richter (born 10 May 1966), is a former South African rugby union player who played for the South Africa national rugby union team between 1992 and 1995.

Career

Province

Richter made his provincial debut for Transvaal in 1988. He moved to Northern Transvaal (later renamed the Blue Bulls) and played 137 matches for the union, captaining the team 80 times.

National Team
He played his first test match for the Springboks on 17 October 1992 against France at the Stade de Gerland in Lyon. He was a member of the South African squad that won the 1995 Rugby World Cup, captaining the Springboks in their victory over Romania, during the pool matches. His last test match was on 10 June 1995 against Samoa, during the 1995 World Cup quarter-finals at Ellis Park in Johannesburg. Richter also played in nineteen tour matches, scoring seven tries for the Springboks.

Test history

See also

List of South Africa national rugby union players – Springbok no. 580

References

External links
1995 Springboks
scrum.com statistics

1966 births
Living people
People from Roodepoort
South African rugby union players
South Africa international rugby union players
Bulls (rugby union) players
Blue Bulls players
South Africa international rugby sevens players
Rugby union players from Gauteng
Rugby union number eights
Rugby union flankers